Marcelle-Gauvreau Ecological Reserve is an ecological reserve in Quebec, Canada. It was established on May 30, 1990, and named in honor of the science educator Marcelle Gauvreau. It is located in extreme southern Mont-Valin, near the town of Sacré-Coeur. Around 116 hectares in size, it was created to protect ecosystems typical of mountainous region around Mont-Valin.
The Sainte-Marguerite River Old Forest protects forest on either side of the reserve.

External links
 Official website from Government of Québec

References

Nature reserves in Quebec
Protected areas established in 1990
Protected areas of Saguenay–Lac-Saint-Jean
1990 establishments in Quebec